James William Dale (born 13 October 1993) is an English professional footballer who plays as a midfielder for Icelandic side Þróttur Vogum.

Early life
Dale was born in Hammersmith, London and attended Bearwood College in Berkshire.

Career
Dale began his footballing career at Reading, playing for the club from the age of 5. He left the club to Join League One club Bristol Rovers. In his youth career, he represented their XI team a number of times.

Dale signed for Forfar Athletic  in the 2012 summer transfer window and made his debut on 3 August 2012.

Dale helped Forfar Athletic beat Rangers 2–1 in the Scottish League Cup at Station Park. This was Forfar's first-ever victory against Rangers.

In 2015 Dale signed with Scottish League One side Brechin City  . In his first successful year at the club he was announced as the club's player's player of the year. In Dale's second year at the Brechin City, he clinched promotion to the Scottish Championship, by scoring in the playoff final, then sealing himself in the club's history by successfully converting the crucial penalty Dale decided to part with Brechin City after the 2017–18 season.

On 23 July 2018, Dale joined Icelandic 1. deild karla side Njarðvíkur.

In May 2019, Dale moved to fellow 1. deild karla side Víkingur, making his debut on 17 May 2019, playing the final few minutes in a 2–1 win over Þróttur.

In February 2022, Dale joined Þróttur Vogum on a free transfer.

Career statistics

Notes

References

External links

1993 births
Living people
English footballers
Association football midfielders
Scottish Professional Football League players
Bristol Rovers F.C. players
University of Stirling F.C. players
Forfar Athletic F.C. players
Brechin City F.C. players
English expatriate footballers
English expatriate sportspeople in Iceland
Njarðvík FC players
Ungmennafélagið Víkingur players
1. deild karla players
Expatriate footballers in Iceland
Þróttur Vogum players